Amanda Stott (born May 6, 1982) is a Canadian singer and songwriter from Brandon, Manitoba, Canada.

Early life and career
Stott was born in Brandon, Manitoba, Canada to Cyril and Tiena Stott. She grew up on her family farm in rural Manitoba, Canada. She has an older brother named Conrad. Her father was a saxophonist and pianist. She started singing in the church choir at Brandon Calvary Temple when she was just three years old. She first gained prominence as a country singer at the Dauphin Country Fest in 1994. In 1999, she signed with Warner Music Canada and her first self-titled album was released in 2000. This album prompted the single "Black Is Black" which quickly became a hit on country radio and television. She was also nominated for a Juno Award for Best New Solo Artist.

After a few years away from the spotlight, Stott returned with a more adult pop sound and her first single, "Paper Rain", reached No. 1 on the Canadian Singles Chart. On March 8, 2005, her second album, Chasing the Sky, was released. It included "Paper Rain" and follow up singles "Homeless Heart" and "She'll Get Over It".

Stott performed on July 1, 2005 as part of the Canada Day celebrations, taking place on Parliament Hill in Ottawa. In the summer of 2005 she toured Canada with fellow female Canadian singers Keshia Chanté, Christine Evans and Cassie Steele. In December 2005 she was a part of the Holiday Train cross-Canada tour along with Wayne Rostad and the Moffatts.

She was a featured singer in the travelling Cirque du Soleil arena show called Delirium, touring North America.

In 2012, she released a single called "Now's Our Time" which features her husband, Matt Young.

Personal life
In October 2010, she married musician Matt Young. They live in Nashville, Tennessee with their two sons who were born in 2013 and 2015.

Discography

Albums

Singles

Music videos

Awards and nominations

See also
List of Canadian musicians

References

External links
 
 

1982 births
Living people
Place of birth missing (living people)
Canadian people of Scottish descent
Canadian women country singers
Canadian country singer-songwriters
Musicians from Brandon, Manitoba
Canadian performers of Christian music
21st-century Canadian women singers